Prasad Prabhakar Oak (Marathi pronunciation: [pɾəsaːd̪ oːk]; born 17 February 1975) is an actor, director, writer, singer, anchor, poet and film producer. In 2007 he participated in Sa Re Ga Ma Pa (Celebrity Round) and won, became Ajinkyatara. He received two Filmfare Awards (best director and best film; 2018) and National Film Award for Best Feature Film in Marathi for the movie Kaccha Limbu.

Early life 
Prasad Oak was born on 17 February 1975 at Pune, Maharashtra. He was raised in an humble Marathi Chitpavan Brahmin family.

Career
Oak started his career as assistant director for the play Premachi Goshta, with actors Shriram Lagoo and Nilu Phule. He got a break in Shree Adhikari Brother's TV serial Badini. Mrunal Kulkarni was his costar in Badini. His critically acclaimed role was in 'Andharyachya Parambya' which was a television series of famous movie 'Barrister'. He has sung in movies including Doghat Tisra...Ata Sagal Visra and Joshi Ki Kamble. He became well established on television with Avaghchi Sansar, playing gray shed role of Harshvardhan Bhosle. This series had the nation's highest ratings in 2008. He claimed that television has had a big role in success of Marathi films.

Oak has worked in more than 80 television serials. In 2008 he participated in reality show Dhinka Chika as a judge. In June 2012 his show Bhanda Suakhyabhare completed 500 episodes.

His play, Bechki started in January 2013 and was written and directed by Chinmay Mandlekar with Oak in the leading role.

In 2018, he played the role of popular Marathi Stage actor Prabhakar Panshikar in Ani... Dr. Kashinath Ghanekar.

Personal life
Oak attended Bhave High School, Pune. He graduated from Brihan Maharashtra College of Commerce. His Spouse is Manjiri Oak. He has two children. Sarthak Oak & Mayank Oak.

Filmography

As actor

As director

Television 
 Bandini (StarPlus)
 Maharashtrachi Hasyajatra as Judge (Sony Marathi)
 Damini (DD Sahyadri)
 Gharkul (ETV Marathi)
 Char Divas Sasuche (ETV Marathi)
 Avaghachi Sansar as Harshwardhan Bhonsale(Zee Marathi)
 Bhanda Saukhya Bhare (Star Pravah)
 Asambhav (Zee Marathi)
 Abhalmaya (Zee Marathi)
 Pimpalpaan (Zee Marathi)
 Vadalvaat as Bhaskar(Zee Marathi)
 Honar Sun Me Hya Gharchi as Kanta (Zee Marathi)
 Phulpakharu (Zee Yuva)
 Hum To Tere Aashiq Hai as Sangramsheth (Zee Marathi)
 Crime Patrol (SET)

Theater 

 Bhramacha Bhopala
 Premachi Ghosta (assistant director)
 Adhantar
 Usna Navra
 Ya Ghar Apalach Ahe
 Lahanapan dega deva
 Nandee 
 Ranangan
 Altun Paltun
 Wada Chirebandi
 Magna Talyakathi
 Aabhas
 Maza Pati Krorepati

References

1972 births
Living people
Marathi actors
Male actors in Marathi cinema
Oak,Prasad
Male actors in Marathi theatre
Male actors in Marathi television